The 50th Cannes Film Festival was held from 7 to 18 May 1997. The Palme d'Or was jointly awarded to Ta'm e guilass by Abbas Kiarostami and Unagi by Shohei Imamura. Jeanne Moreau was the mistress of ceremonies.

The festival opened with The Fifth Element, directed by Luc Besson, and closed with Absolute Power, directed by Clint Eastwood.

Juries

Main competition
The following people were appointed as the Jury for the feature films of the 1997 Official Selection:
Isabelle Adjani (France) Jury President
Gong Li (China)
Mira Sorvino (USA)
Paul Auster (USA)
Tim Burton (USA)
Luc Bondy (Switzerland)
Patrick Dupond (France)
Mike Leigh (UK)
Nanni Moretti (Italy)
Michael Ondaatje (Canada)

Caméra d'Or
The following people were appointed as the Jury of the 1997 Caméra d'Or:
 Françoise Arnoul (actress) (France)
 Gérard Lenne (critic) (France)
 Jiří Menzel (director) (Czech Republic)
 Julien Camy (cinephile) (France)
 Luciano Barisone (critic) (Italy)
 Nicolas Philibert (director) (France)
 Olivier Brunet-Lefebvre (cinephile) (France)
 Ulrich Gregor (cinema historian) (Germany)

Official selection

In competition - Feature film
The following feature films competed for the Palme d'Or:

 Assassin(s) by Mathieu Kassovitz
 The Banned Woman (La femme défendue) by Philippe Harel
 The Brave by Johnny Depp
 The Eel (Unagi) by Shohei Imamura
 The End of Violence by Wim Wenders
 Funny Games by Michael Haneke
 Happy Together (Chun gwong cha sit) by Wong Kar-wai
 The Ice Storm by Ang Lee
 Kini and Adams by Idrissa Ouedraogo
 L.A. Confidential by Curtis Hanson
 Nil by Mouth by Gary Oldman
 The Prince of Homburg (Il principe di Homburg) by Marco Bellocchio
 The Serpent's Kiss by Philippe Rousselot
 She's So Lovely by Nick Cassavetes
  The Sweet Hereafter by Atom Egoyan
  Taste of Cherry (Ta'm e guilass) by Abbas Kiarostami
 The Truce (La tregua) by Francesco Rosi
 Welcome to Sarajevo by Michael Winterbottom
 The Well by Samantha Lang
 Western by Manuel Poirier

Un Certain Regard
The following films were selected for the competition of Un Certain Regard:

 12 Storeys by Eric Khoo
 A, B, C... Manhattan by Amir Naderi
 After Sex (Post-Coitum, Animal Triste) by Brigitte Roüan
 Akrebin Yolculuğu by Ömer Kavur
 American Perfekt by Paul Chart
 Brother (Brat) by Aleksei Balabanov
 La Buena Estrella by Ricardo Franco
 La cruz by Alejandro Agresti
 East Palace, West Palace (Dong gong xi gong) by Zhang Yuan
 Gudia by Gautam Ghose
 Histoire(s) du cinéma by Jean-Luc Godard
 The House (A Casa) by Šarūnas Bartas
 In the Company of Men by Neil LaBute
 Inside/Out by Rob Tregenza
 Love and Death on Long Island by Richard Kwietniowski
 Marcello Mastroianni: I Remember (Marcello Mastroianni: mi ricordo, sì, io mi ricordo) by Anna Maria Tatò
 Marius and Jeannette (Marius et Jeannette) by Robert Guédiguian
 Mrs Brown by John Madden
 Private Confessions (Enskilda samtal) by Liv Ullmann
 Sunday by Jonathan Nossiter
 Wind Echoing in My Being by Jeon Soo-il
 The Witman Boys (Witman fiúk) by János Szász

Films out of competition
The following films were selected to be screened out of competition:

 Absolute Power by Clint Eastwood
 The Blackout by Abel Ferrara
 Destiny (Al-massir) by Youssef Chahine
 The Fifth Element by Luc Besson
 Hamlet by Kenneth Branagh
 Michael Jackson's Ghosts by Stan Winston
 Nirvana by Gabriele Salvatores
 Voyage to the Beginning of the World (Viagem ao Princípio do Mundo) by Manoel de Oliveira
 Welcome to Woop Woop by Stephan Elliott

Short film competition
The following short films competed for the Short Film Palme d'Or:

 Le Bon Endroit by Ayelet Bargur
 Camera obscura by Stefano Arduino
 Final Cut by Justin Case
 ...Is It the Design on the Wrapper? (Est-ce à cause du dessin sur l'emballage?) by Tessa Sheridan
 Joe by Sasha Wolf
 Leonie by Lieven Debrauwer
 Over The Rainbow by Alexandre Aja
 Les Vacances by Emmanuelle Bercot

Parallel sections

International Critics' Week
The following films were screened for the 36th International Critics' Week (36e Semaine de la Critique):

Feature film competition

 Junk Mail (Budbringeren) by Pål Sletaune (Norway)
 Mother of the Dunes (Faraw !) by Abdoulaye Ascofaré (Mali)
 This World, Then the Fireworks by Michael Oblowitz (United States)
 Le Mani forti by Franco Bernini (Italy)
 Character (Karakter) by Mike van Diem (Netherlands)
 Bent by Sean Mathias (United Kingdom)
 Insomnia by Erik Skjoldbjærg (Norway)

Short film competition

 The Signalman (Le Signaleur) by Benoît Mariage (Belgium)
 Marylou by Todd Kurtzman & Danny Shorago (United States)
 Adios Mama by Ariel Gordon (Mexico)
 Tunnel of Love by Robert Milton Wallace (United Kingdom)
 Muerto de amor by Ramón Barea (Spain)
 O Prego by João Maia (Portugal)
 Le Voleur de diagonale by Jean Darrigol (France)

Directors' Fortnight
The following films were screened for the 1997 Directors' Fortnight (Quinzaine des Réalizateurs):

 Buud-Yam by Gaston Kaboré
 Cosmos by André Turpin, Arto Paragamian, Denis Villeneuve, Jennifer Alleyn, Manon Briand, Marie-Julie Dallaire
 Dakan by Mohamed Camara
 Hamam by Ferzan Ozpetek
 I Hate Love (J'ai horreur de l'amour) by Laurence Ferreira Barbosa
 Kicked In The Head by Matthew Harrison
 Kissed by Lynne Stopkewich
 L'autre côté de la mer by Dominique Cabrera
 The Good Life (La buena vida) by David Trueba
 La Vie de Jésus by Bruno Dumont
 Ma 6-T va crack-er by Jean-François Richet
 Ma vie en rose by Alain Berliner
 Murmur of Youth by Lin Cheng-sheng
 The Perfect Circle (Savrseni Krug) by Ademir Kenović
 The Power of the Skirt (Taafe Fanga) by Adama Drabo
 A Friend of the Deceased by Viacheslav Kryshtofovych
 Sinon, oui by Claire Simon
 My Son the Fanatic by Udayan Prasad
 Suzaku by Naomi Kawase
 Train of Shadows (Tren de sombras) by José Luis Guerin
 Un frère… by Sylvie Verheyde

Short films

 Liberté chérie by Jean-Luc Gaget
 Soyons amis ! by Thomas Bardinet
 Taxi de nuit by Marco Castilla
 Tout doit disparaître by Jean-Marc Moutout
 Y’a du foutage dans l’air by Djamel Bensalah

Awards

Official awards
The following films and people received the 1997 Official selection awards:
Palme d'Or:
 Taste of Cherry (Ta'm e guilass) by Abbas Kiarostami
 The Eel (Unagi) by Shōhei Imamura
Grand Prize of the Jury: The Sweet Hereafter by Atom Egoyan
Best Director: Wong Kar-wai for Happy Together (Chun gwong cha sit)
Best Screenplay: The Ice Storm by James Schamus
Best Actress: Kathy Burke for Nil by Mouth
Best Actor: Sean Penn for She's So Lovely
Jury Prize: Western by Manuel Poirier
 50th Anniversary Prize: Youssef Chahine (Lifetime Achievement Award)
 Palm of the Palms: Ingmar Bergman
Golden Camera
Caméra d'Or: Moe no suzaku by Naomi Kawase
Caméra d'Or - Special Mention: La Vie de Jésus by Bruno Dumont
Short Films
Short Film Palme d'Or: ...Is It the Design on the Wrapper? by Tessa Sheridan
Jury Prize: Leonie by Lieven Debrauwer & Les Vacances by Emmanuelle Bercot

Independent awards
FIPRESCI Prizes
 The Sweet Hereafter by Atom Egoyan (In competition)
 Voyage to the Beginning of the World (Viagem ao Princípio do Mundo) by Manoel de Oliveira (Out of competition)
Commission Supérieure Technique
 Technical Grand Prize: Thierry Arbogast (cinematography) in She's So Lovely and The Fifth Element
Ecumenical Jury
 Prize of the Ecumenical Jury: The Sweet Hereafter by Atom Egoyan
 Ecumenical Jury - Special Mention: La Buena Estrella by Ricardo Franco & Voyage to the Beginning of the World (Viagem ao Princípio do Mundo) by Manoel de Oliveira
Award of the Youth
Foreign Film: Bent by Sean Mathias
French Film: I Hate Love (J'ai horreur de l'amour) by Laurence Ferreira Barbosa
Awards in the frame of International Critics' Week
Mercedes-Benz Award: Junk Mail (Budbringeren) by Pål Sletaune
Canal+ Award: The Signalman (Le signaleur) by Benoît Mariage
Association Prix François Chalais
François Chalais Award: The Perfect Circle (Savrseni krug) by Ademir Kenović

References

Media
INA: Climbing of the steps for the opening of the 1997 Festival (commentary in French)
INA: List of winners of the 1997 festival (commentary in French)

External links

1997 Cannes Film Festival (web.archive)
Official website Retrospective 1997 
Cannes Film Festival Awards 1997 at Internet Movie Database

Cannes Film Festival, 1997
Cannes Film Festival, 1997
Cannes Film Festival
Cannes Film Festival
Cannes